Naisten Liiga, also called the Naisten SM-liiga (NSML) and Jääkiekon naisten SM-liiga, is the elite league for women's ice hockey in Finland. Founded by the Finnish Ice Hockey Association as the Naisten SM-sarja in 1982, it was so known until being rebranded as the Naisten Liiga in 2017. The league comprises approximately 250 players across ten teams.

Kiekko-Espoo (previously 'Espoo Blues' and 'Espoo United') has dominated Naisten Liiga in the 21st century, winning sixteen Finnish Championships during the span of 1999 to 2022. Tampereen Ilves is the second most successful club, with ten championship titles, and are the only organization to have iced a team in every season since the league's inception.

A majority of teams in Naisten Liiga share their names with men's professional teams in the Liiga or Mestis – HIFK, HPK, Ilves, KalPa, Kiekko-Espoo, Kärpät, Lukko, RoKi, TPS – but the women's teams have historically received few resources and limited promotion from the affiliated men's clubs. In recent years progress has been made in building better relationships between the men's and women's teams; most men's clubs now provide some support to their women's counterparts by advertising games together or helping secure sponsorships.

Teams

2022–23 season

Past participants

1980s 
Ässät (Pori), 1982–1995
EVU (Vantaa), 1982–1990
Haukat (Järvenpää), 1982–83
HJK (Helsinki), 1982–1986
Jäähonka (Espoo), 1982–1984
SaiPa (Lappeenranta), 1982–1992
Shakers (Kerava), 1982–1985 & 1986–1996
Tiikerit (Hämeenlinna), 1982–1984, 1987–88 & 1989–90
Kiekko-Vesa (Raahe), 1983–1985
Teräs-Kiekko (Raahe), 1983–1985
Ilves-Kiekko (Tampere), 1984–1987 & 1988–1990
Ketterä (Imatra), 1984–85 & 1991–1993
StU (Savitaipale), 1984–85

1990s 
Karhut (Joensuu)
JoKP, 1992–1994
Kiekko-Karhut, 1994–1997
Karhut, 1997–98
Tappara (Tampere), 1993–94 & 1997–2008
JyP HT (Jyväskylä)
JyP HT, 1989–1997
JYP, 1997–2000
IHK (Helsinki), 1998–2009 
K-Kissat (Helsinki), 1999–2002

2000s 
JyHC (Jyväskylä)
JyHC, 1996–2004
Cats, 2004–2009
JYP, 2009–2016 & 2020–21
KS Noux (Espoo), 2002–03
Y-Ilves (Ylöjärvi), 2002–2004
Team China, 2005–2007 
 LoKV (Lohja), 2008–2012
 Salo HT (Salo), 2008–2013
 APV (Alavus), 2009–10, 2019–20 & 2021–22
 KJT (Kerava)
KJT, 2013–2018
KJT Haukat, 2018–19

 Sport (Vaasa), 2018–2022

Sources:

Format

Season format 
The Finnish Ice Hockey Association has altered the season format of the Naisten Liiga several times over the league's history. The system currently in use was introduced for the 2022–23 season. It added six games per team to the regular season schedule and matched the season structure of the league's closest neighbor, the Swedish Women's Hockey League (SDHL). The new format replaced the previous twenty-game preliminary series and ten-game divisional series structure, which was first introduced in the 2018–19 season and refined prior to the 2019–20 season.

Regular season

The regular season is a quadruple round-robin tournament, with each team playing every other team four times – generally speaking, each team plays every other team twice at home and twice away, though there are some small variations – resulting in a 36-game season per team. Teams are ranked by points, with three points awarded for a win in regulation time, two points for an overtime win, one point for an overtime loss, and no points awarded for a regulation loss. Individual player statistics from the regular season determine the winner of the Marianne Ihalainen Award, for most points, and the Tiia Reima Award, for most goals scored.

The top eight teams at the end of the regular season qualify for the Naisten Liiga playoffs.

Playoffs

The three rounds of the Naisten Liiga playoffs are played as a best-of-five tournament, with the exception of the single-elimination game for the Finnish Championship bronze medal. In the quarterfinals, the initial round, teams are paired by seeding from the regular season, with the first seed facing the eighth seed, the second seed facing the seventh seed, and so on.

The champions of the Naisten Liiga playoffs receive the Aurora Borealis Cup as league champions and gold medals as Finnish Champions in women's ice hockey. Selected by the Finnish Ice Hockey Association, the MVP of the playoffs is awarded the Karoliina Rantamäki Trophy.

Qualification

The teams finishing the season ranked ninth and tenth play a promotion/relegation series against the top two teams of the Naisten Mestis regular season. The two teams that finish the series with the most points qualify for the following Naisten Liiga season and the two lower ranked teams are relegated to or remain in the Naisten Mestis for the following season.

Game format 

A regulation game is sixty minutes in length, played over three 20-minute periods. In the event of a tie at the end of regulation time the winner is decided by a five-minute-length, three-skaters-per-side overtime period. If the game remains tied after the overtime period, the teams proceed to a shootout, in which each team designates three skaters to take penalty shots, one at a time, against the opposing goaltender. Teams alternate shots and each team takes one shot per round. The winner is the team with more goals after three rounds or the team that amasses an unreachable advantage before the third round. If the shootout is tied after three rounds, tie-breaker rounds are played one at a time until there is a winner.

Champions

All-time medal count 
 – team participating in 2022–23 Naisten Liiga season

Notes:

Sources:

Finnish Champions by season 

Notes:

Sources:

League records 
All-time records of the Naisten SM-sarja and Naisten Liiga combined, from 1982–83 through the conclusion of the 2021–22 season.

Single-season records
 Most goals in a season: Riikka Sallinen, 73 goals (21 games; 1993–94, Shakers Kerava)
 Most assists in a season: Jenni Hiirikoski, 62 assists (28 games; 2015–16, JYP Jyväskylä)
 Most points in a season: Riikka Sallinen, 129 points (21 games; 1993–94, Shakers Kerava)
 Most points in a season, defenceman: Jenni Hiirikoski, 79 points (29 games; 2015–16, JYP Jyväskylä)
 Best points per game in a season, over ten games played: Riikka Sallinen, 6.14 points per game (129 points in 21 games; 1994, Shakers Kerava)

 Most penalty minutes in a season: Jenna Grönroos, 98 PIM (15 games; 2011–12, LoKV)
Single-playoff records

 Most goals in a playoff: Elisa Holopainen, 19 goals (12 games; 2022, Kiekko-Espoo) 
 Most assists in a playoff: Susanna Tapani, 14 assists (6 games; 2015, HPK Hämeenlinna) 
 Most points in a playoff: Elisa Holopainen, 29 points (12 games; 2022, Kiekko-Espoo) 
 Most points in a playoff, defenceman: Nelli Laitinen, 21 points (10 games; 2022, Kiekko-Espoo) 
 Best points per game in a playoff: Riikka Sallinen, 4.40 points per game (22 points in 5 games; 1994, Shakers Kerava)
 Most penalty minutes in a playoff: Marjo Voutilainen, 45 PIM (4 games; 2012, KalPa)

Career records 
 Most career games played, skater: Riikka Noronen, 644 games (1995–2022)
 Most career goals: Karoliina Rantamäki, 375 goals (403 games; 1992–2022)
 Most career assists: Riikka Noronen, 447 assists (644 games; 1995–2022)
 Most career points: Riikka Noronen, 775 points (644 games; 1995–2022)
 Best career points per game, over 30 games played: Michelle Karvinen, 3.667 points per game (39 games; 2007–2009)
 Most career points, defenceman: Päivi Virta, 495 points (401 games; 1982–2006)
 Most career penalty minutes: Rosa Lindstedt, 483 PIM (314 games; 2002–2016)
 Most career games played, goaltender: Susanna Airaksinen, 224 games (2009–2022)

 Most shutouts in a career: Tiina Ranne, 29 shutouts (169 games; 2010–2022)

All-time scoring leaders
The top-ten point-scorers in Naisten SM-sarja/Naisten Liiga history. Statistics valid through conclusion of 2021–22 season.

Note: Nat = Nationality; Pos = Position; S = Seasons played; GP = Games played; G = Goals; A = Assists; Pts = Points; P/G = Points per game;  = player active in 2022–23 Naisten Liiga season

See also 
 Women's ice hockey in Finland
 Finland women's national ice hockey team
 Swedish Women's Hockey League

References

External links 
Official website (in Finnish)
 League information and statistics from EliteProspects.com and EuroHockey.com and HockeyArchives.info (in French)

Naisten Liiga (ice hockey)
Ice hockey leagues in Finland
Women's ice hockey in Finland
Women's ice hockey leagues in Europe
Women's sports leagues in Finland